In mathematical physics, four-dimensional Chern–Simons theory, also known as semi-holomorphic or semi-topological Chern–Simons theory, is a quantum field theory developed by Kevin Costello, and later by Edward Witten and Masahito Yamazaki. It is named after mathematicians Shiing-Shen Chern and James Simons who discovered the Chern–Simons 3-form appearing in the theory.

The gauge theory has been demonstrated to be related to many integrable systems, including exactly solvable lattice models such as the six-vertex model of Lieb and the Heisenberg spin chain and integrable field theories such as principal chiral models, symmetric space coset sigma models and Toda field theory. It is also closely related to the Yang–Baxter equation and quantum groups such as the Yangian.

The theory is similar to three-dimensional Chern–Simons theory which is a topological quantum field theory, and the relation of 4d Chern–Simons theory to the Yang–Baxter equation bears similarities to the relation of 3d Chern–Simons theory to knot invariants such as the Jones polynomial discovered by Witten.

Formulation 

The field content is a gauge field . The action is given by wedging the Chern–Simons 3-form  with :

Restrictions on underlying manifolds 
This theory is studied perturbatively, in the limit that the Planck constant . In the path integral formulation, the action will contain a ratio . So  may have poles, but not zeroes.

In the latter case,  has no poles and  a complex torus (with  a 2d lattice). If , then  is  the complex projective line. Therefore  is either a complex plane, cylinder or torus.

This imposes that  must be a parallelizable 2d manifold, which is also a strong restriction: for example, if  is compact, then it is a torus.

Systems described by 4d Chern–Simons theory
 Six-vertex model
 Eight-vertex model
 XXZ Heisenberg spin-chain
 Gross–Neveu model
 Thirring model
 Wess–Zumino–Witten model
 Principal chiral model and deformations
 Symmetric space coset sigma models

A notable omission which does not admit a 4d CST description in an obvious way is the Sine-Gordon model.

Other theories describing integrable systems
4d Chern–Simons theory is a 'master theory' for integrable systems, providing a framework that incorporates many integrable systems. Another theory which shares this feature, but with a Hamiltonian rather than Lagrangian description, is classical affine Gaudin models.

External links
 nLab page

References

Quantum field theory
Integrable systems